Dunshah (also Romanized as Dūnshāh) is a village in Miankuh Rural District, Chapeshlu District, Dargaz County, Razavi Khorasan Province, Iran. At the 2006 census, its population was 42, in 12 families.

References 

Populated places in Dargaz County